Dawson Airport may refer to:
Dawson City Airport (IATA: YDA) near Dawson City, Yukon, Canada
Dawson Community Airport (IATA: GDV) near Glendive, Dawson County, Montana, United States